WLCU-CD, virtual channel 4 (UHF digital channel 15), a low-powered, Class A educational independent television station licensed to Campbellsville, Kentucky, United States. The station is owned by Campbellsville University. It airs religious services as well as local sports, music, and public affairs programming. On cable, the station is mostly carried on channel 22 in the Campbellsville area.

History 
The station's construction permit was granted by the FCC on May 30, 1984, under the callsign W04BP. More than two years later, the station was officially licensed on June 6, 1986, and it then signed on shortly after. It was originally under ownership of Heartland Communications, Inc., and initially aired a mixture of programming from CMT and Tempo Television, and also periodically aired college football and basketball games involving the University of Louisville Cardinals athletic programs. Unlike Campbellsville's other television outlet at the time, WGRB-TV (later WBKI-TV, channel 34, now defunct), the station also opened a news department that aired at least two newscasts every day. W04BP used its radio sister stations to promote the television outlet.

Sometime between 1987 and 1990, Tempo and CMT were dropped by the station in favor of becoming a FamilyNet affiliate on a secondary basis, but becoming a religious independent station on a primary basis. In 1990, the station was sold to the mass media department of Campbellsville University. In 2007, the station's callsign was changed to WLCU-CA.

In 2015, the station filed an application to switch to digital as it was required for low-power analog stations to convert to digital by the original deadline of September 2015, which was moved down to Spring 2021. The station was licensed for digital operation on May 28, 2015, moving from analog VHF channel 4 to digital UHF channel 23. Upon the conversion, the station's callsign was changed to the current WLCU-CD. Just before FamilyNet ceased operations prior to their rebranding as the Cowboy Channel, the station then became an educational independent station in 2018.

On October 18, 2019, the station reallocated its digital signal to UHF channel 15 as part of the station's participation in the 2016-17 FCC broadcast spectrum repacking auction.

Coverage area and market status 
WLCU's signal can be received in good portions of Taylor and Green Counties, along with good portions of Adair, Marion, and southern Nelson Counties, all of which are located within the southeastern fringes of the Louisville DMA.

References

External links

Official website

LCU-CD
Television channels and stations established in 1986
Independent television stations in the United States
Low-power television stations in the United States